Ermen de Jesús Benítez Mesías (born 4 May 1961) is an Ecuadorian former international footballer who played professionally as a striker.

He is the Serie A (Ecuador's top league) all-time topscorer, having scored 191 goals for five clubs in 16 years as a professional.

Personal life
He is the father of the late Ecuadorian international Christian Benítez.

References

External links
FIFA profile

1961 births
Living people
Sportspeople from Esmeraldas, Ecuador
Ecuadorian footballers
Ecuador international footballers
Ecuadorian expatriate footballers
C.D. El Nacional footballers
Xerez CD footballers
Barcelona S.C. footballers
L.D.U. Quito footballers
L.D.U. Portoviejo footballers
Ecuadorian Serie A players
Association football forwards